Baptist Church of Mizoram is a Baptist Christian denomination in India. It is affiliated with the Baptist World Alliance. The headquarters is in Lunglei, Mizoram.

History
The Baptist Church of Mizoram has its origins in an English Baptist mission established in 1894, by Frederick William Savidge and James Herbert Lorrain of the Baptist Missionary Society.  In 1914, the first council of the Church was formed.  In 2000, it founded the Academy of Integrated Christian Studies. 

According to a denomination census released in 2020, it claimed 663 churches and 122,072 members.

A concise account of Mission Department
A concise account of the BCM Mission works, as it stands for 46 years (1966 – 2012) from the inception of the BCM Mission Department as the Zoram Baptist Mission, can be made as follows:

Missionary personnel 
ZBM started cross-culture missionary work, employing only two full-time missionaries in 1939. Now, (in 2012) BCM Mission Committee has more than 800 mission workers including missionaries.

Mission fields and stations 
BCM Mission Committee has 23 mission fields including mission stations in different parts of India and works in partnership with other mission agencies outside India.

Mission fund 
The ZBM (as its previous name) had only Rs. 12.50p (Rupees twelve and fifty paisa) in its initial stage. Now the BCM Mission budget of 2012 - 2013 has grown to Rs.11, 79, 78,000.00(Rupees eleven crore seventy-nine lakhs and seventy-eight thousand).

Schools and students 
At present Mission Committee runs 54 mission schools within and outside Mizoram, of which 10 are High Schools, 5 Middle Schools, 39 Primary Schools and having around 6500 students.

Beliefs 
BCM is a member of the Baptist World Alliance.

Education

Academy of Integrated Christian Studies (AICS)

The Academy of Integrated Christian Studies (AICS) is a BD Level theological institution established by the Baptist Church of Mizoram in 2000 under the leadership of Prof. Dr. R.L.Hnuni. This institution offers several programs such as Theological Training, Missionary Training, Ministerial Training, Music Training and Research and Development. The institution is located in Shekina Hill.

Baptist Higher Secondary School (BHSS)Baptist Higher Secondary School is a school owned by Baptist Church of Mizoram. The school enrolls students for Secondary and Higher Secondary levels. The current Principal of Baptist Higher Secondary School is Pu. R. Zosangliana. The current Vice Principal is Pu. R.Lalneihthanga.

The school has three hostels, one for Junior section, the Girls’ hostel and one for the boys. The over all administration is run by the Principal with the help of the two Vice Principals. The over all strength of the staff is around 80 in number. The school's motto is "The Utmost for the Highest".

Baptist Church of Mizoram expanded the school into lower classes including Nursery to Middle Schools by merging with co-existing school called Baptist English School , thus, from  2005 it is known as Baptist Higher Secondary School Junior Section'''. It enrolls a number of 1,070 students in the 2019-20 Academic Session with 43 Teaching Staffs. The current Vice Principal for Baptist Higher Secondary School Junior Section is Pu. Z.D. Lalnunmawia.

Higher and Technical Institute of Mizoram (HATIM)

See also 
 Christianity in Mizoram
 Council of Baptist Churches in Northeast India
 North East India Christian Council
 List of Christian denominations in North East India

References

External links
 

Baptist denominations in India
1894 establishments in British India
Religious organizations established in 1894
Christianity in Mizoram
Baptist denominations established in the 19th century
Affiliated institutions of the National Council of Churches in India